Cranfield is an unincorporated community in Adams County, Mississippi.

History
Cranfield is located on the former Mississippi Central Railroad. The community is named for J. D. Cranfield, who donated the original right of way when the railroad was built through the area. A post office operated under the name Cranfield from 1906 to 1921.

The Cranfield Oil Field is located in Cranfield and was first discovered in 1943. In its first three years, the oil field produced 4.8 million barrels of oil.

References

Unincorporated communities in Adams County, Mississippi
Unincorporated communities in Mississippi
Unincorporated communities in Natchez micropolitan area